Bonnie Story (born March 18, 1959) is an American Emmy Award-winning choreographer best known for her work in the films High School Musical, High School Musical 2, and High School Musical 3. Her work has been presented on FOX dance show "So You Think You Can Dance".

Career
Bonnie Story has choreographed many pieces for Odyssey Dance Theater. However, due to the reception of the third installment of High School Musical, she decided to take a break from her work at Odyssey. Currently, she runs various dance programs at the Treehouse Athletic Club located in Draper, Utah. In 2012, Story choreographed international dance scenes for Loving the Silent Tears, a Broadway-style musical, based on Supreme Master Ching Hai's poetry collection, Silent Tears.

Personal life
The story has 5 children: Bayli, Kelli, Zach, Tobin ,and Easton Baker. Her daughter Kelli Baker was a contestant on So You Think You Can Dance (Season 4). She auditioned in Salt Lake City, USA and made it to the second week in Las Vegas, Nevada. However, she was eliminated just before the Top 20 were selected.

Filmography

References

External links
 

American choreographers
Living people
Place of birth missing (living people)
Primetime Emmy Award winners
1959 births